The Bristol Combination Cup is an annual rugby union knock-out club competition organised by the Bristol and District Rugby Football Combination – one of the five bodies that make up the Gloucestershire Rugby Football Union.  It was first introduced during the 1970–71 season, with the inaugural winners being Bristol Harlequins.  A plate competition was introduced during the 1985–86 season for teams knocked out of the early rounds of the Bristol Combination Cup, with St Brendans Old Boys being the inaugural winners.  The plate was discontinued at the end of the 2002–03 season and has since been replaced by the Bristol Combination Vase, which is for lower ranked clubs in the region.

The Bristol Combination Cup is currently open for clubs sides based in Bristol and the surrounding countryside (including parts of Gloucestershire and Somerset), playing in tier 4 (National League 2 South), tier 5 (National League 3 South West) and tier 6 (Tribute South West 1 West) of the English rugby union league system.  The format is a knockout cup with quarter-finals, semi-finals and a final to be held at the Memorial Stadium in Bristol in April–May.

Bristol Combination Cup winners

Bristol Combination Plate winners

Number of wins

Cup
St Mary's Old Boys (11)
Avonmouth Old Boys (8)
Dings Crusaders (7)
Clifton (5)
Old Redcliffians (4)
Cleve (3)
Hornets (3)
Bristol Harlequins (2)
Keynsham (2)
Clevedon (1)
Old Bristolians (1)
St. Brendans Old Boys (1)
Weston-super-Mare (1)
Whitehall (1)

Plate
Avonmouth Old Boys (3)
Aretians (2)
Ashley Down Old Boys (2)
Bristol Harlequins (2)
Frampton Cotterell (2)
Bristol Saracens (1)
Chipping Sodbury (1)
Gordano (1)
Old Redcliffians (1)
Southmead (1)
St Brendans Old Boys (1)
Thornbury (1)

See also
 Gloucestershire RFU
 Bristol and District Rugby Football Combination
 Bristol Combination Vase
 Bristol Combination Cyril Parsons Bowl

 English rugby union system
 Rugby union in England

References

External links
 Gloucestershire RFU
 Bristol & District Rugby Football Combination

Recurring sporting events established in 1970
1970 establishments in England
Rugby union cup competitions in England
Rugby union in Bristol
Rugby union in Gloucestershire
Rugby union in Somerset